Lutherville station is a Baltimore Light Rail station located in Lutherville, Maryland. Like most suburban stations on the system, it has two side platforms serving the line's two tracks. It opened in 1992 as part of the initial operating segment.

History

The Northern Central Railway stopped at Lutherville until local services ceased around 1959. The former station building is still extant.

Prior to the opening of the light rail system, the current parking lot was a park-and-ride lot with express bus service.

In July 2009, two teenage boys were struck by a light rail train near Lutherville station. The boys were likely unaware of single-tracking, which caused a train to come from the opposite direction than they would have expected. Two operators were fired and six other employees disciplined in December 2009, but it remained unclear whether the deaths could have been prevented by the operators following proper procedures. MTA instituted new regulations pertaining to trespassing on light rail tracks as a result of the deaths. These include strictly enforcing the existing trespassing laws, alerting police immediately if someone is spotted on or near the light rail tracks, and enforcing speed regulations on trains until the trespasser is removed.

References

External links

MTA Maryland - Light Rail stations

Baltimore Light Rail stations
Lutherville, Maryland
Railway stations in the United States opened in 1992
Railway stations in Baltimore County, Maryland
1992 establishments in Maryland